3 Squadron or 3rd Squadron may refer to:

Aviation squadrons
No. 3 Squadron RAF
No. 3 Squadron RAAF
No. 3 Squadron RCAF
No. 3 Squadron RNZAF
No. 3 Squadron, Indian Air Force
No. 3 Squadron RAF Regiment, a British field squadron
3rd Tactical Squadron, Poland
3rd Tactical Fighter Squadron (JASDF), Japan

United States
3d Airlift Squadron
3d Fighter Training Squadron
3d Special Operations Squadron
3d Weather Squadron

Naval squadrons 
3rd Battle Squadron, Royal Navy
3rd Battlecruiser Squadron, Royal Navy

See also
 3rd Wing